Outreach Dance is a UK-based Independent Regional Radio station, broadcasting on DAB Digital Radio to Portsmouth, Winchester & Basingstoke.

History

The station was conceived by the directors of Outreach Radio following the success of their dance music section on their weekend schedule: "Club Lockdown".

Following the launch of the Winchester small-scale DAB multiplex in October 2022, Outreach Dance became available on DAB+ for listeners in Winchester and surrounding areas.

Following the launch of the Basingstoke small-scale DAB multiplex in November 2022, Outreach Dance, alongside their sister station, Outreach Radio, became available on DAB+ for listeners in Basingstoke and surrounding areas.

As of 1 January 2023, Outreach Dance also became available on DAB+ via the Portsmouth small-scale DAB trial multiplex, serving Portsmouth and surrounding areas.

The station is currently available on mobile devices via radio streaming apps such as Radioplayer, Online Radio Box or myTuner. It is also available on Amazon Alexa and Google Home. In October 2022, Outreach Dance also became featured on the UK Radio Portal, making their service available to connected Freeview homes across all ITV Meridian regions on Freeview channel 277.

Transmitters

Digital (DAB)

Presenters

Current Presenters
Osman Şen-Chadun (DJ Oz) [2022-]
Matt Belsey (2022-)
Andrew Kingshott (DJ Kingshott) [2022-]
Bumi Benjamin (DJ Bumi) [2022-]
Terence Mthimkhulu (Mr. Twist) [2022-]
Tansyn Govan (Court Jester) [2022-]
Robert Green (Robin) [2022-]
Nicole Mcilveen (Nixy Rose) [2022-]
Adrian Romagnano (2022-)
Daniel Barker (DJ Bakka) [2022-]

Former Presenters

See also
Outreach Radio
Symonds Radio
Sam FM (South Coast)
Power FM
Ocean Sound
Wave 105
Win 107.2
107.4 The Quay
Isle of Wight Radio
Spirit FM (UK radio station)
Delta FM
Kestrel FM
Spire FM

References 

Radio stations in Hampshire
Radio stations in England
Mass media in Hampshire